Lawnmower Man 2: Beyond Cyberspace (also subtitled Jobe's War) is a 1996 American science fiction action film written and directed by Farhad Mann, and starring Matt Frewer, Patrick Bergin, Austin O'Brien, and Ely Pouget. It is a sequel to the 1992 film The Lawnmower Man. The film was negatively reviewed by both critics and fans of the original film.

Plot
The founder of virtual reality, Dr. Benjamin Trace, has lost a legal battle to secure a patent on the most powerful worldwide communications chip ever invented. Touted as the one operating system to control all others, in the wrong hands the "Chiron Chip" has the potential to dominate a society dependent on computers. When corporate tycoon and virtual reality entrepreneur Jonathan Walker takes over development of the Chiron Chip, he and his team discover Jobe Smith barely alive after the destruction of Virtual Space Industries. After having his face reconstructed and his legs amputated, they hook him up to their database to have him help them perfect the Chiron Chip.

Six years later, a now 16-year-old Peter Parkette is a computer hacker living in the subways of a cyberpunk Los Angeles with a group of other runaway teens. While hooked into Cyberspace, Jobe reconnects with Peter and asks him to find Trace for him. Peter locates Trace living in a desert and brings him to his hideout to speak with Jobe. Jobe shows Trace his newly constructed cyber world and asks about the Egypt link, a hidden Nano routine in the chip's design. Trace refuses to tell him, noting that Jobe is insane and would not understand its power. Enraged, Jobe hacks into the subway system's  computer to send another train crashing into the one Trace and the teenagers are in, but Trace causes the runaway train to crash into a construction site instead.

Walker and his team at "Virtual Light Industries" plan on announcing the functions of the chip and its virtual city to the public and world leaders, though Walker wants to use them for spying and blackmail. He uses Jobe to deal with anything that could stop him, such as crashing a plane carrying a senator who is opposed to the launch, and killing anyone who gets too close to the truth through virtual reality. Trace, Peter, and the others make an attempt to break into Virtual Light to steal the chip, but are nearly killed by Jobe before they are rescued by Dr. Cori Platt, Trace's former partner and lover.

After stealing the chip they find it is a decoy. Walker keeps the real chip in his office and the launch of the chip seems inevitable. Jobe begins causing havoc through the chip by accessing credit accounts, ATM machines, and water and power in an attempt to destroy the world so that everyone may join and follow him as a virtual messiah. Walker attempts to stop Jobe but is gunned down by his own security.

The group returns to Virtual Light Industries. Trace explains that the Egypt link is a dam function designed to prevent "ultimate power". Jobe has built around the link without knowing its purpose. Trace and the others confront Jobe in his virtual city, in an attempt to get him roused enough to overpower himself. "Egypt" kicks in, destroying the virtual city and reducing Jobe to his simpleton persona. Peter goes to see Jobe before a wounded Walker takes Peter hostage in an attempt to bargain for the chip. Jobe distracts Walker long enough for Trace to strike him, causing him to land on exposed wiring that kills him. Peter and the others collect Jobe as they go home.

Cast

Production
The first Lawnmower Man had been New Line Cinema's highest grossing theatrical release of 1992 and a sequel had been initially advertised with the title Lawnmower Man 2: Mindfire on the 1993 VHS releases of the first film. Filming for the sequel commenced in March 1995 in Los Angeles with only Austin O'Brien returning from the original. Pierce Brosnan was initially asked to return as well but was unavailable due to the production of GoldenEye - this led to the hiring of Patrick Bergin as Dr. Benjamin Trace. Original director Brett Leonard was directing Virtuosity at the same time and did not return to helm the sequel to his original film.

Reception
Lawnmower Man 2 was poorly received by critics, with a 10% rating on Rotten Tomatoes, based on 9 reviews, with an average rating of 2.4/10. The plot and characters were generally negatively received, while the visual effects received mixed reviews.

References

External links
 
 

1996 films
Films about computing
Films about telepresence
American films about revenge
1996 science fiction films
American science fiction action films
Techno-thriller films
Films directed by Farhad Mann
Films scored by Robert Folk
Films shot from the first-person perspective
1990s English-language films
1990s American films